Balvir Singh is a teacher and Democratic politician from Burlington Township, New Jersey who has served on the Burlington County Board of County Commissioners since 2018. Singh is the first Asian American to win a countywide election in Burlington County and the first Sikh American to win a countywide election in New Jersey.

Burlington Township Board of Education
In 2014, Singh was elected to the board of education of the Burlington Township School District, coming in third place of the five candidates seeking three open seats. As a board member, Singh served as Chair of the school district's finance committee. Over the three years Singh served in that role, taxes and overall spending increases were contained within the school district's budgets each year.

Commissioner election
Singh announced his intention to run for Burlington County Board of County Commissioners in March 2017 with running mate Tom Pullion. During the course of the campaign, Singh criticized the all-Republican Burlington County Board for focusing on bringing warehouse jobs to the region, stating that these types of businesses attract unskilled laborers and create traffic in local communities. Singh was criticized by his Republican opponents for his support of tax increases while on the Burlington Township Board of Education and for his support of gubernatorial candidate Phil Murphy. The Republicans also ran social media ads claiming that Singh would harbor criminal immigrants and support sanctuary city policies if elected. Singh stated after the election that such immigration policies fall out his jurisdiction as a Freeholder, and therefore were irrelevant points to be made.

In October 2017, it was revealed by the Burlington County Times that the Burlington County Democratic Committee sent more funds outside of the county to assist New Jersey Senate President Stephen M. Sweeney than they spent within the county to support Singh and Pullion's election. On election day, Singh and Pullion were declared the victors by a narrow margin in an election where voter turnout was at a record low.

Commissioner
Singh was sworn in to the Burlington County Board of County Commissioners on January 3, 2018. The oath of office was administered by Central New Jersey politician Vin Gopal, who was then Senator-Elect for New Jersey's 11th Legislative District. Gopal is the first Indian-American to be elected to New Jersey's State Senate,

Singh voted in favor of the 2018 County budget, which resulted in a reduction in property taxes. The budget also called for a cut in the amount of money going into the Burlington County farmland preservation and open space fund since only two farms had applied for the program during the 2018 fiscal year, and neither accepted the county's offer.

At the March 19, 2018 Board meeting, Republican Commissioner introduced a resolution to expand the Burlington County Women's Advisory Council's size from 15 to 20 members. Singh and Pullion expressed concern that current members were being dismissed and that new members were being chosen without a public advertisement of the vacancies. The resolution passed along a party-line vote.

On June 13, 2018, Singh and Pullion cast dissenting votes on a motion to grant an $89,500 contract for architectural services for security studies within the schools of Burlington County. During the meeting, a resident addressed the Board and alleged that the firm had donated to Republican campaigns in the past.  Singh and Pullion cited the firm that was granted the contract, alleging that the appointment was made for political reasons.

In January 2019, Singh joined with fellow Democrats on the Board to rescind the county's so-called "double dipper ban," which would prohibit Burlington County from employing any individual already collecting a taxpayer-funded pension unless they agreed to freeze their pension payments. Singh argued that the ban prevented hiring experienced individuals for publicly funded jobs within the county.

Personal life
Balvir Singh was born in India, and immigrated to US during childhood with his family. He grew up in a one-bedroom apartment in Burlington City. Singh has been married to his wife, Sandeep Kaur, since 2010. The couple have three children: son Gaganjeet Singh, daughter Gurleen Kaur Singh, and son Avijeet Singh.

References

See also
 Indian Americans in New Jersey

Year of birth missing (living people)
Living people
American Sikhs
American politicians of Indian descent
Asian-American people in New Jersey politics
New Jersey Democrats
People from Burlington Township, New Jersey
Rutgers University alumni
School board members in New Jersey
The College of New Jersey alumni